Daniel Wells is a British racing driver from Salisbury.

Career

Karting
He competed in 11 Senior Rotax kart races in the South of the United Kingdom - setting a fastest lap in a field of 24 in his first ever race at Clay Pigeon.

Formula Ford
In 2010 Wells graduated to Formula Ford 1600. Together with engineer John Percy - who ran him out of a single trailer - Wells took five class poles and five class wins in seven race weekends.

This brought him to the attention of the Racing Steps Foundation for their 2010 Formula Renault UK Winter Cup shoot-out.  Wells graduated to Formula Renault UK in late 2010, taking part in the 2010 Formula Renault UK Winter Cup.

Wells finished 5th in his first ever race weekend, lapping a tenth of a second off experienced team mate Alex Lynn. In the second weekend, Wells suffered incidents and mechanical failures, coming away with a best result of 11th.

Formula Renault 
Wells joined the 2011 Formula Renault UK championship with Atech Reid GP from Round 3. He finished 10th in the overall in the standings, 22 shy of 7th place, with a best result of 4th at Rockingham and Brands Hatch.

In the Formula Renault UK Final Series, he scored three podiums in six races, with a best result of 2nd at Snetterton. He emerged as Vice Champion of the series, never finishing outside the top 6 beating Red Bull and McLaren backed drivers. Over the winter, Wells worked to secure the necessary budget for a 2012 Formula Renault UK seat. However, in March 2012 it was announced that Formula Renault UK series would not take place in 2012.

Formula Pilota China
On 28 March 2012, Wells announced he would compete in the Formula Pilota China Series in 2012, for the Hong Kong-based KCMG team.

Racing record

Career summary

References

External links
 
 

1991 births
Living people
Sportspeople from Southampton
English racing drivers
British Formula Renault 2.0 drivers
Formula Renault Eurocup drivers
Formula Masters China drivers
British Formula Three Championship drivers
Japanese Formula 3 Championship drivers
Asian Le Mans Series drivers
Asian Formula Renault Challenge drivers
Fortec Motorsport drivers
KCMG drivers
Double R Racing drivers
Eurasia Motorsport drivers
TCR International Series drivers
Campos Racing drivers
Chinese F4 Championship drivers
BlackArts Racing drivers
Lamborghini Super Trofeo drivers